Coalgate was an unincorporated community in Raleigh County, West Virginia, United States. It was formerly named Blockston.

References 

Unincorporated communities in West Virginia